DZRD (981 AM) Sonshine Radio is a radio station owned and operated by Sonshine Media Network International. The station's studio and transmitter are located along Catacadang Rd., Brgy. Bonuan Gueset, Dagupan.

References

Radio stations in Dagupan
Radio stations established in 1967
News and talk radio stations in the Philippines